The Jamdhar-Katari is the traditional dagger of the Hindu Kush strains in Afghanistan.

History
The Jamdhar-Katari was developed approximately in the 17th century in the area of the Hindu Kush.

Description 
The Jamdhar-Katari has a wedge-shaped, double-edged blade of about 25 cm in length, with a total length of about 35 cm. Shortly after the parry the blade runs along narrow, then something bulbous get through to the top. Some of the site (top) is reinforced in order to be strong enough armor and chainmail to pierce. The parry is remarkably wide (about 15 cm). The knob has the same width. Blade, parry, grip and pommel are made of one piece and have no handles.

References 
 Lord Egerton of Tatton, Wilbraham Egerton Egerton, Indian and Oriental Armour, Verlag Courier Dover Publications, 2002, Ausgabe illustriert, 
 George Cameron Stone, Donald J. LaRocca, A Glossary of the Construction, Decoration and Use of Arms and Armor: in All Countries and in All Times, Verlag Courier Dover Publications, 1999, Seiten 314-315
 Indian Museum, Indian and Oriental Arms and Armour, Verlag Courier Dover Publications, 2002, 
 Wilbraham Egerton Egerton (Earl), India Museum, An illustrated handbook of Indian arms and those of Nepal, Burma, Thailand, Malaya, Volume 1 of Bibliotheca Orientalis, Verlag White Orchid Press, 1981

Daggers